Perry Sink Marshall is an American business consultant, and author of books on marketing, business strategy, communications technology, and evolution.

Life 
Marshall is the son of a pastor. He graduated with a degree in electrical engineering from the University of Nebraska-Lincoln.

Work and publications 

Marshall was a national sales manager at Synergetic Micro Systems; he left in 2001 after the company was bought by Lantronix.
He started a marketing consultancy, Perry S. Marshall & Associates, and published his first book, Industrial Ethernet: A Pocket Guide. It was followed by second and third editions, co-written with John Rinaldi.

Marshall learned to use Google AdWords soon after it was first introduced.

In 2002, he released Guerrilla Marketing for Hi-Tech Sales People, an audio CD. With Bryan Todd, he wrote The Definitive Guide to Google AdWords in 2006, and Ultimate Guide to Google AdWords in 2007.

In 2011, with Thomas Meloche, Marshall published Ultimate Guide to Facebook Advertising.

He wrote 80/20 Sales and Marketing, published in 2013, expanding on  Richard Koch's 80/20 rule, as it applies to various areas in the operation of a business. Inc. reviewed it as one of the "5 Best Sales Books of 2013".

He wrote a paper detailing the underlying mathematical basis of the 80/20 rule, which was published in the June 2018 issue of the Harvard Business Review, Italian edition.

His paper entitled Biology transcends the limits of computation was published in the journal Progress in Biophysics and Molecular Biology in October 2021.

Evolution
In 2015, he published Evolution 2.0: Breaking the Deadlock Between Darwin And Design (BenBella Books, Inc.),  a publicly accessible account of scientific progress supporting extended evolutionary synthesis.

The book accepts the process of Natural Selection, but based on the work of Barbara McClintock, Lynn Margulis, James A. Shapiro and Denis Noble, rejects the hypothesis that variation arises primarily from random  DNA copying errors. It summarises the argument of Hubert Yockey that DNA transcription and translation are encoding and decoding as defined in information theory expounded by Claude Shannon and not derivable from currently known laws of physics. He provides an overview of the following mechanisms, which he regards as more likely sources of variation:

 Epigenetics – heritable phenotype changes that do not involve alterations in the DNA sequence
 Transposition – the rearrangement of DNA segments to different locations in the gene
 Horizontal gene transfer – the transfer of genetic material between organisms
 Hybridization – the outcome of sexual reproduction between two distinct species
 Symbiogenesis – the theory that some organelles of eukaryotic cells are descended from formerly free-living prokaryotes

Evolution 2.0 Technology Prize
Marshall has organized a private equity group and created the Evolution 2.0 prize, which is presently a $10 million reward for an Origin Of Information experiment that can be specified as a patentable process. He announced the prize at the Royal Society in May 2019.

The Evolution 2.0 prize is offered to anyone who can demonstrate a spontaneously arising communication system that matches Claude Shannon’s 1948 definition. Marshall says that if claims that codes are an emergent property of nature are true, then the problem should be in principle solvable and commercially valuable. He suggests that such a discovery would produce breakthrough results in Artificial Intelligence research.

Submissions will be evaluated by a judging panel consisting of:
 George Church, Harvard & MIT
 Denis Noble, Oxford University
 Michael Ruse, Florida State University

Cancer Symposium and Working Group
Marshall was a co-organiser - with Frank H. Laukien, James A. Shapiro, Denis Noble and Henry Heng - of the three-day Cancer and Evolution Symposium in October 2020, and was the facilitator of the third day of that event.  This symposium led to the creation of the Cancer Evolution Working Group within the American Association for Cancer Research, and to the monthly online Cancer Evolution Seminar Series.

References 

Living people
American business writers
American advertising executives
University of Nebraska alumni
21st-century American non-fiction writers
Year of birth missing (living people)
Extended evolutionary synthesis
Symbiogenesis researchers